The 1977–78 Notre Dame Fighting Irish men's basketball team represented the University of Notre Dame during the 1977–78 NCAA men's basketball season. The team was led by head coach Digger Phelps and played their home games at the Joyce Center.

Notre Dame entered the season with high expectations, as they opened with an AP preseason ranking of No. 4. Battle tested from a challenging schedule, the Irish earned a spot in the 1978 NCAA Tournament and played their way to the first Final Four appearance in school history.

Roster

Schedule and results

|-
!colspan=9 style=| Regular Season

|-
!colspan=9 style=| NCAA Tournament

Rankings

References

Notre Dame Fighting Irish men's basketball seasons
Notre Dame
Notre Dame
NCAA Division I men's basketball tournament Final Four seasons
Notre Dame Fighting Irish
Notre Dame Fighting Irish